Island(s) called Cocos or Coco include the following:

Cocos:
Cocos Island, off the Pacific coast of Costa Rica (Spanish: Isla del Coco)
Cocos Island (Panama), in the Pearl Islands, Gulf of Panama (Spanish: Isla de Cocos)
Cocos (Keeling) Islands, a territory of Australia in the Indian Ocean
Île aux Cocos, off Rodrigues, Mauritius
Cocos Island, Seychelles, north of Felicité, Seychelles
Cocos Islands, an early name for Niuafoʻou and Niuatoputapu in the northern reaches of Tonga

Coco:
Coco Islands, in the Indian Ocean near North Andaman Island
Cayo Coco, Cuba
Coco Cay (Little Stirrup Cay), Bahamas

See also
 Coconut Island (disambiguation)
 Caicos Islands, in Turks and Caicos Islands